Karoti  is a village in Sirohi District of Rajasthan state in India. It is situated at 48 km east of the Sirohi. headquarters of the tehsil as reodar well as Panchayat Samiti by the same name. Lunol village is in the north and Bhatana is in the west.  Mandar is the main village connecting to Gujarat.

 It is also a Legislative Assembly Constituency of Rajasthan.

Villages in Sirohi district